"The Forgotten War" (capitalized) most often refers to:

 Forgotten War (book), a 2013 book about the Australian frontier wars
 Korean War (in the United States)
 Ifni War (in Spain)

The term forgotten war is also sometimes, though much less commonly and less specifically, used to refer to:
 Southern theater of the American Revolutionary War
 Philippine–American War
 War of 1812 (outside of the United States)
 First Barbary War and Second Barbary War
 Campaigns in Finland during World War II (outside of Finland); see Military history of Finland during World War II
 Forest Brothers resistance in the Soviet-occupied Baltic states
 Laotian Civil War (outside of Laos)
 Burma Campaign (outside of Burma)
 Spanish Civil War (outside of Spain)
 Soviet–Afghan War  
 First Chechen War and Second Chechen War (outside of Chechnya) 
 War in Afghanistan (2001–2021) (outside of Afghanistan) 
 War in Donbas (2014–2022) (outside of Ukraine)

Wars by type